The TAC Cup Nanjing Challenger is a tennis tournament held in Nanjing, China since 2016. The event is part of the ATP Challenger Tour and is played on outdoor clay courts.

Past finals

Singles

Doubles

References

External links 
 ITF search

ATP Challenger Tour
Clay court tennis tournaments
Tennis tournaments in China
Sport in Nanjing